Lalande 21185 (also known as BD+36 2147, Gliese 411, and HD 95735) is a star in the south of Ursa Major. It is the apparent brightest red dwarf in the northern hemisphere. Despite this, and being relatively close by, it is (as are all red dwarfs) very dim, being only magnitude 7.5 in visible light and thus too faint to be seen with the unaided eye. The star is visible through a small telescope or binoculars.

Because of its proximity it is a frequent subject for astronomical surveys and other research and thus is known by numerous other designations, most commonly Gliese 411 and HD 95735. In approximately 19,900 years it will be at its closest, about 4.65 ly (1.43 pc) from the Sun, just over half its present distance.

History 

The celestial coordinates of Lalande 21185 were first published in 1801 by French astronomer Jérôme Lalande of the Paris Observatory in the star catalog Histoire céleste française. The catalog sequence numbers for majority of the observed stars, including this one, were introduced in its 1847 edition by Francis Baily. Today this star is one of just a few that are still commonly referred to by their Lalande catalog number.

In May 1857, Friedrich Wilhelm Argelander discovered the high proper motion of the star. It was sometimes called "Argelander's second star". (The "first Argelander's star" is Groombridge 1830, whose high proper motion was discovered by Argelander earlier—in 1842).

Friedrich August Theodor Winnecke is reported to have made the first measurement of the star's parallax of 0.511 arc seconds in 1857–58 and thus first identifying Lalande 21185 as the second-closest-known star to the Sun, after the Alpha Centauri system. Since that time better measurements have placed the star farther away, but it remained the second-closest-known star system until the  astrophotographic discovery of two dim red dwarfs, Wolf 359 and Barnard's Star, in the early 20th century.

Properties
Lalande 21185 is a typical type-M main-sequence star (red dwarf) with about 39% of the mass of the Sun and is much cooler than the Sun at 3,550 K. It is intrinsically dim with an absolute magnitude of 10.48, emitting most of its energy in the infrared. The proportion of elements other than hydrogen and helium is estimated based on the ratio of iron to hydrogen in the star when compared to the Sun. The logarithm of this ratio is −0.20, indicating that the proportion of iron is about 10−0.20, or 63% of the Sun. The surface gravity of this relatively compact star is approximately 65 times greater than the gravity at Earth's surface (log g = 4.8 cgs), which is more than twice the surface gravity of the Sun.

Lalande 21185 is listed as a BY Draconis type variable star in the General Catalogue of Variable Stars. It is identified by the variable star designation NSV 18593. Several star catalogs, including SIMBAD, also classify it as a flare star. This conclusion is not supported by the primary reference these catalogs all use. The observations made in this reference show that it is rather quiet in comparison to other stars of its variable type.

Lalande 21185 emits X-rays, and X-ray flares have been observed.

It is the brightest star between variable CO Ursae Maj and the comparably bright star HD 95129 to its west (specifically by south) and is a little closer to the latter.

Planetary system

Data published in 2017 from the HIRES system at the Keck Observatory on Mauna Kea supported the existence of a close-in planet with an orbital period of just 9.8693±0.0016 days, being at least .
Further radial velocity research with the SOPHIE échelle spectrograph and review of the original signal found that the 9.9 day period was undetectable, and instead proposed, using both datasets, an exoplanet orbiting the star with a period of either 12.95 or 1.08 days, much more likely 12.95, insofar as 1-day-period exoplanets seem to be rare in systems. This would give the planet a minimum mass of 2.99 Earth masses. It is too close to the star, and so therefore too hot, to be in the habitable zone, at all points within its eccentric orbit.

A second planet with a more distant orbit was initially noticed by SOPHIE, but the baseline was not long enough to confirm the several-year-long signal.

A third planet, Gliese 411 d, is suspected to orbit between Gliese 411 b and Gliese 411 c with a period of 215 days.

 
 
 
 

The habitable zone for this star, defined as the locations where liquid water could be present on an Earth-like planet, is at a radius of 0.11–0.24 AU, where 1 AU is the average distance from the Earth to the Sun. The planet b has an equilibrium temperature of 370.1 K. Other known planets are outside HZ boundaries too, but undetected low-mass ones may be orbiting in this region of this system as well.

Past claims of planets
In 1951 van de Kamp and his student Sarah Lippincott claimed the astrometric detection of a planetary system using photographic plates taken with the  refractor telescope at Swarthmore College's Sproul Observatory. She used the original photographic plates and new plates taken with the same telescope. Photographic plates from this observatory, taken at the same time, were used by Van de Kamp for his erroneous claim of a planetary system for Barnard's Star. The plates made with the Sproul 24-inch refractor and used for these and other studies were in 1973 shown to be flawed; as they were the next year with astrometric measurements made by George Gatewood of the Allegheny Observatory.

In 1996 the same Gatewood prominently announced at an AAS meeting and to the popular press the discovery of multiple planets in this system, detected by astrometry. The initial report was based on a very delicate analysis of the star's position over the years, which suggested reflex orbital motion due to one or more companions. Gatewood claimed that such companions would usually appear more than 0.8 arcseconds from the red dwarf itself. Though, a paper by Gatewood published only a few years earlier and later searches by others, using coronagraphs and multifilter techniques to reduce the scattered-light problems from the star, did not positively identify any such companions, and so his claim remains unconfirmed and is now in doubt.

Before the 1980s, finding the radial velocity of red dwarfs was neither very accurate nor consistent, and so due to its apparent brightness and because it does not have a companion, this star, along with eleven other similar red dwarf stars, were chosen to have their radial velocity measured, to unprecedented high accuracy, by planet hunter Geoff Marcy. No companion was detected around this star in this nor other contemporary surveys, and such early equipment would have picked up any planet exceeding  in an extremely close orbit of 5 days or less; or exceeding  at about Jupiter's orbital distance.

See also 
 70 Ophiuchi
 Barnard's Star
 List of nearest stars
 Wolf 359

References

Notes

External links 
 
 
 Extrasolar Planets Encyclopaedia: Confirmed (planet candidate) super-Earth planet Lalande 21185 b. Retrieved 2017-02-15

095735
High-proper-motion stars
054035
0411
BD+36 2147
Local Bubble
M-type main-sequence stars
Ursa Major (constellation)
Planetary systems with two confirmed planets
BY Draconis variables
J11032023+3558117